Resident Evil is an American action horror television series developed by Andrew Dabb for Netflix. Loosely based on the video game series of the same name by Capcom, it is the second television adaptation of the franchise after the animated miniseries Infinite Darkness (2021), and the third live-action adaptation after the film series of the same name and the reboot film Welcome to Raccoon City (2021). The series is set in its own universe but features the video game series' storyline as its backstory and basis.

The series features an ensemble cast led by Lance Reddick as the clones of Albert Wesker, Ella Balinska and Adeline Rudolph as Wesker's children, Tamara Smart and Siena Agudong as the daughters' younger selves, and Paola Núñez as James Marcus's daughter Evelyn. It alternates between two timelines, following Jade and Billie Wesker during their days in New Raccoon City where they discover their father's and Umbrella Corporation's dark secrets, and 14 years in the future, where Jade tries to survive the end of the world.

In 2019, Netflix began development with Constantin Film, the rightsholders who have previously produced the film series, as the production company involved. The series was formally announced in 2020, having been greenlit as an eight-episode series with each episode one hour in length. Dabb was hired as showrunner alongside a number of other Netflix projects. Due to the COVID-19 pandemic, production was delayed eight months and took place from February to July 2021. Resident Evil premiered on July 14, 2022, to mixed reviews from critics and negative reviews from audiences. In August 2022, the series was canceled after one season.

Plot
The series' main plot is spread out over two points in time – 2022 and 2036, with a gap of some 14 years. The past plotline deals with the struggles of 14-year-old fraternal twins Billie and Jade, the children of Dr Albert Wesker, conceived through suspicious circumstances. Their lives take a dramatic turn when Albert is awarded an executive position at the struggling Umbrella Corporation that once employed him, and they move to Umbrella's planned community, New Raccoon City. While there the two girls stumble onto the dark secrets behind their origins and Umbrella's dark legacy, their father coordinates a response to the outbreak of a retroviral bioweapon called T-virus.

In the present of 2036, the T-virus has reduced human civilization to 300 million refugees living in walled city-states and other settlements, surrounded by the six billion man-eating humans known as Zeroes who contracted the disease. The most powerful organization left on Earth is the Umbrella Corporation, backed by its military arsenal, who are conducting a global manhunt for Jade.

Cast and characters

Main
 Ella Balinska as Jade Wesker
 Tamara Smart as young Jade Wesker
 Adeline Rudolph as Billie Wesker
 Siena Agudong as young Billie Wesker
 Paola Núñez as Evelyn Marcus
 Lance Reddick as:
 Dr. Albert "Al" Wesker, Jade and Billie's father
 Bert Wesker, Jade and Billie's uncle and Al's brother
 Alby Wesker, Al and Bert's deceased brother
 Albert Wesker, a rogue Umbrella operative who created several clones of himself

Recurring
 Turlough Convery as Richard Baxter
 Connor Gosatti as Simon Marcus
 Ahad Raza Mir as Arjun Batra
 Ella Zieglmeier as Bea
 Pedro de Tavira Egurrola as Angel Rubio

In addition, Anthony Oseyemi co-stars as Roth, Lea Vivier co-stars as Susana Franco, Casey B. Dolan co-stars as Lisa Trevor, and Marisa Drummond co-stars as a guard.

Episodes

Production

Development 
In January 2019, it was announced that Netflix was in development of a series based upon the Resident Evil franchise. No major updates were given, until August 2020 when it was revealed that the series had been picked up for 8 one hour episodes. It was also revealed that Andrew Dabb would write the series, in addition to him serving as an executive producer and showrunner. Bronwen Hughes was also executive producer and directed the first two episodes.

Production was originally set to take place from June to October 2020, to be handled by Moonlighting Films, which previously worked on Resident Evil: The Final Chapter. Due to the COVID-19 pandemic, however, these plans were shelved for the rest of the year. Over 2020 the series went through retooling, with the promotion of Jeffrey Howard as co-Executive Producer in place of Dabb who was busy overseeing Grendel. Production resumed on February 19, 2021, with principal photography split into four production blocks and concluding on July 9. On August 26, 2022, Netflix canceled the series after one season.

Casting 
Casting took place in November 2020, with casting directors working in the United Kingdom, United States for the principal cast, and South Africa for the supporting cast and extras. American actor Lance Reddick was cast in the role of Albert Wesker. The role of Billie Wesker was given to American actresses Siena Agudong and Adeline Rudolph, with British actresses Tamara Smart and Ella Balinska cast as her sister Jade. Paola Núñez was cast in the role of Wesker's assistant, Carol. Pakistani actor Ahad Raza Mir joined the cast for the role of Arjun Batra.

Filming
Principal photography took place from February to July 2021. Internal scenes were filmed on a soundstage at Cape Town Film Studios, while dilapidated local buildings such as the Werdmuller Centre and the Maitland Abattoir were used for location filming. Production was divided into four production blocks, with directors Bronwen Hughes, Rob Seidenglanz, Batán Silva and Rachel Goldberg each responsible for two episodes each. As part of block 3, scenes were filmed aboard the Sarah Baartman and S.A. Agulhas, with the help of Frog Squad, a company specialising in underwater filming.

Marketing
While Netflix maintained a press embargo on the series before and during principal photography, a synopsis for an early series pitch was accidentally published and then deleted. Similarly, an early copy of the first episode's script was published on the Internet Archive before being taken down in a copyright complaint. The series was officially announced in August 2020, with Andrew Dabb posting the front page of the completed "Welcome to New Raccoon City" script, with the principal cast being announced near the end of filming in June 2021.

Marketing for the series proper began on November 30, 2021, with the opening of an official Instagram page for the series, which posted an image of a mutant dog which was set to appear. Two trailers were released online on May 11, 2022, with the first two episodes aired at a private press screening. In attendance, Dabb described the original universe of the show as featuring the video games as their backstory and basis.

Release 
The series was released on July 14, 2022, on Netflix.

Reception

Critical reception 
The review aggregator website Rotten Tomatoes reported a 54% approval rating with an average rating of 5.8/10, based on 50 critic reviews. The website's critics consensus reads, "While Resident Evil comes closer than previous adaptations to honoring the beloved video games' labyrinthine lore, this zombie serial could still use more brains." On Metacritic, the first season has a score of 53 out of 100, based on 16 critics, indicating "mixed or average reviews". The audience and fan reaction to the show was overwhelmingly negative.

Audience viewership 
According to Samba TV, 988,000 US households watched the premiere of the series during its first four days streaming on Netflix. The series premiere over-indexed most with Black and Hispanic viewers by +29% and +27% respectively. It debuted second, behind Stranger Things (season 4), then dethroned it days later. From July 11 to July 17, the show was the second most streamed on Netflix globally, and was within the top ten in over 92 countries.

Notes

References

External links
 
 

Resident Evil
2022 American television series debuts
2022 American television series endings
2020s American drama television series
2020s American horror television series
2020s American science fiction television series
American action television series
American sequel television series
American television shows based on video games
English-language Netflix original programming
Horror drama television series
Live action television shows based on video games
Nonlinear narrative television series
Post-apocalyptic television series
Television productions postponed due to the COVID-19 pandemic
Television series about sisters
Television series about twins
Television series about viral outbreaks
Television series set in the 2020s
Television series set in the 2030s
Television shows filmed in South Africa
Television shows set in Brighton
Television shows set in France
Television shows set in Kent
Television shows set in London
Television shows set in South Africa
Works based on Capcom video games
Zombies in television